Krzczonów-Skałka  is a settlement in the administrative district of Gmina Krzczonów, within Lublin County, Lublin Voivodeship, in eastern Poland.

References

Villages in Lublin County